WJLX (1240 AM) is a radio station licensed to serve Jasper, Alabama. The station is owned by Don Earley.  It airs a full-service oldies music format.

The station was assigned these call letters by the Federal Communications Commission since January 29, 2008, when it swapped with then-sister station WLYJ.

History
In September 1993, Radio South, Inc., reached an agreement to sell country music formatted WARF to New Century Radio, Inc. The deal was approved by the FCC on September 27, 1993.

The station was assigned the call letters WTID by the FCC on January 9, 2003.  In May 2004, New Century Radio, Inc. (Vachel L. Posey Jr., president) reached an agreement to sell WTID to Joy Christian Communications Inc. (Ed L. Smith, president) for a reported sale price of $200,000.  The deal was approved by the FCC on June 28, 2004, and the transaction was consummated on July 9, 2004.  At the time of the sale, the station broadcast an oldies music format. The new owners had the FCC change this station's call letters to WLYJ on September 8, 2004.

The station was assigned the call letters WZTQ by the FCC on September 17, 2007, when it swapped with then-sister station WLYJ. Just before the station was put up for sale, on January 29, 2008 the owners had the station's callsign changed again, this time to WJLX.

In February 2008, Joy Christian Communications Inc. reached an agreement to sell WJLX to Walker County Broadcasting (through their subsidiary, Wal Win LLC, headed by shareholder Brett Elmore). Wal Win LLC agreed to pay in full the mortgage held against real property (with the pay-off being $300,000) in exchange for the station.  The deal was approved by the FCC on March 27, 2008, and the transaction was consummated on April 11, 2008.

On October 1, 2009 WJLX changed their format to oldies, branded as "Oldies 101.5" (the FM frequency is translator W268BM, which relays WJLX on 101.5 FM).

Wal Win sold WJLX to the Hattie Reese Trust effective January 19, 2017 for $150,000. The station's license was subsequently assigned to John Burdette upon the dissolution of the Trust effective November 20, 2017.

Effective May 1, 2018, the station was sold to Don Earley, who owns the Alabama Cable Network. The station retained General Manager Brett Elmore as well as on-air talent Johnny Elmore and Woody Wilson.

References

External links

JLX
Oldies radio stations in the United States
Walker County, Alabama